The Robert-Bourassa generating station, formerly known as La Grande-2 (LG-2), is a hydroelectric power station on the La Grande River that is part of Hydro-Québec's James Bay Project in Canada. The station can generate 5,616 MW and its 16 units were gradually commissioned between 1979 and 1981.  Annual generation is in the vicinity of 26500 GWh.

Together with the adjacent 2,106 MW La Grande-2-A generating station (LG-2-A), commissioned in 1991–1992, it uses the reservoir and dam system of the Robert-Bourassa Reservoir to generate electricity. The two plants taken together account for more than 20% of Hydro-Québec's total installed capacity of 36,810 MW in 2009. It is Canada's largest hydroelectric power station, ranks in 12th place on the list of largest hydroelectric power stations and is the world's largest underground power station.

Initially known as La Grande-2, it was renamed after Robert Bourassa who, as Premier of Quebec (1970–1976 and 1985–1994) gave the James Bay Project a vital political impetus.

Context 

The Robert-Bourassa generating station is the main facility of the James Bay hydroelectric project, a large hydroelectric complex built on the La Grande River, a large river in Quebec's sparsely populated northern Quebec. It was also the first to be built, between 1974 and 1981. It was inaugurated by Premier René Lévesque of Quebec, on October 27, 1979.

Conception work on the generating station, dam and reservoir began in October 1970 when Montreal-based engineering firm Rousseau Sauvé Warren (RSW) was given by Hydro-Québec to make the case for the development of the La Grande River. Another engineering firm,  Asselin, Benoît, Boucher, Ducharme & Lapointe (ABBDL) was tasked with a feasibility study on the more southerly NBR (Nottaway, Broadback, Rupert) concept. At RSW the development of the La Grande River was championed by François Rousseau, one of firm's associates and a former Hydro-Québec senior engineer.

A final decision to build the hydroelectric complex on the La Grande hydrographic system was made in 1972, after engineers determined the NBR project would be less cost effective because of the silty nature of the soils in the NBR area. The La Grande option had the added advantages of a lesser impact on First Nations hunting and fishing, on the boreal forest and would require less flooding.

Construction 

Twenty-nine dykes of various sizes close the reservoir.

It hosts 16 Francis turbines, set up in two groups of eight each.

In 1974, in what was one of the most extreme cases of workplace sabotage up to that time, workers at the La Grande-2 site used bulldozers to topple electric generators, damage fuel tanks, and set buildings on fire.  The project was delayed a year, and the direct cost of the damage estimated at CAD$2 million. The causes were not clear, however three factors have been cited: inter-union rivalry, poor working conditions, and the perceived arrogance of American executives at the contractor, Bechtel Corporation.

Road 

Engineering firm Desjardins, Sauriol and Associates were tasked with the construction of a basic road to the future site and the Cree settlement at Fort George. The deadline was tight:  in 450 days.

The first challenge involved deploying teams of land surveyors and lumberjacks by seaplanes and helicopters to clear a path for a permanent road. Parallel to the path, a few kilometres away, an ice road was built to move heavy machinery north. The first milestone was reached on February 11, 1972, with the opening of the  ice bridge crossing the Rupert River.
 
The temporary road reached the La Grande River in December 1972, allowing the minimum necessary level of access needed to begin work – namely to construct housing for the thousands of people who would work on the dam for the next decade. A permanent road surfaced with gravel was completed on October 20, 1974, at a cost of $348 million, and was paved over the next two years.

Temporary diversion
The first stage of construction was the temporary diversion of the La Grande River; the tunnels had to be big enough to protect the construction site from floods, but not so large as to unnecessarily increase cost. Two diversion tunnels were drilled into the left bank of the river and were opened on April 27, 1975. For the next three and a half years the flow of the river would be diverted through the tunnels.

Since the original construction schedule called for completion on February 15, 1980, the south diversion tunnel was scheduled to be closed in November 1978, during low river flows in the winter. However, the deadline was revised forward by 60 days, and the tunnel had to be reinforced to withstand harsh autumn conditions.

Dam and dykes 

The core of the earthfill dam is made of glacial moraine which is impervious, and available in large quantities within a  radius of the dam site, due to extensive glaciation of the area during the last ice age. The core is slightly inclined upstream, to increase resistance against the immense pressure of water in the reservoir. The layers above consist of fill zones of varying coarseness, and is surfaced with riprap to reduce erosion.

The original plan envisioned the construction of a concrete-face rock-fill dam, but this was rejected in favor of a more conventional embankment design, partly because of the lower cost, and also because the concrete face would have to be inspected from time to time requiring drainage of the reservoir. Because of the huge size of the reservoir, this would be essentially impossible.

Dikes D-1 to D-4 are located immediately to the north; D-5 to D-14 (the "Forebay dikes") to the south; and D-17 to D-27 (the "Duncan dikes") about  further south.

Reservoir 

Because of its great size, it is inhabited by a diverse array of aquatic flora and fauna.

On November 27, 1978, the diversion tunnels were closed and water began to back up behind the dam. The enormous reservoir took over a year to completely fill.

Dessaulniers pump station 
The construction of the Duncan dikes partially blocked the flow of the Dessaulniers River, which is located to the southeast of the Robert-Bourassa Reservoir. To prevent the flooding of an additional  and preserve the lake in its natural state, a pump station was installed which removes water from the Dessaulniers to the Robert-Bourassa Reservoir.

The pump station was commissioned in June 1977. Each pump is powered by a 1,120 KW (1,500 hp) motor. The pumping station also served to divert water away from the Dessaulniers river bed, during the construction of dike D-20.

Spillway 

The spillway, nicknamed Staircase of the Giants, is near the north end of the main dam and is part of dike D-4. It consists of a concrete control structure and a man-made waterfall discharging into a stilling basin below the dam. The gates are opened and closed by cable winches, in order to control spills. The eight gates are all opened at the same time once every 15 years.

Having passed through the gates, the kinetic energy of the water is dissipated in a  basin at the foot of the control structure.

Generating station 
With an installed capacity of 5,616 megawatts, it is the largest power station owned by Hydro-Québec, and the largest underground power station in the world. On October 27, 1979, 3,000 people gathered for the dedication of the power plant by Quebec Premier René Lévesque.

The plant was constructed by Rousseau Sauvé Warren (RSW) of Montreal. Unlike other facilities in the James Bay Project, the LG2 was constructed to imperial rather than metric specifications, even though Canada had converted to the metric system in the 1970s.

The power station can be accessed either by an elevator or a tunnel. The plant has 16 Francis turbines, divided into two sets of eight each, and separated by a mounting area, workshops, control room, elevator shaft and ventilation system.

The turbines were built by two partners of James Bay Energy (SEBJ). Units 1, 3, 5, 7, 10, 12, 14 and 16 were built by Marine Industries Limited (MIL), while units 2, 4, 6, 8, 9, 11, 13 and 15 were built by Canadian General Electric (alternators) and Dominion Engineering Works (turbines). The two groups have somewhat different characteristics. The turbines manufactured by MIL are lighter, 96 tonnes compared to 111, and have fifteen blades, compared to 11 for the other group.

Each turbine is rated at 339 MW at a  head and a speed of 133.33 rpm. The generators are rated at 370 megavolt amperes (MVA), which is increased to 390 MVA in the winter.

La Grande-2-A

Photos

See also 

 List of largest power stations in Canada
 List of conventional hydroelectric power stations
 List of hydroelectric stations in Quebec
 Reservoirs and dams in Canada

References

Works cited 
  (also available in English, under the title Hydro-Québec After 100 Years of Electricity)
 .
 .
 .
 .

External links 

 Hydro-Québec - Robert-Bourassa Generating Facility

James Bay Project
Dams completed in 1981
Dams in Quebec
Dams on the La Grande River
Publicly owned dams in Canada